The Michigan and Ohio Railroad is a defunct railroad which operated in southern Michigan in the mid-1880s. Originally intended to forge a new line from Lake Erie to Lake Michigan, it came close to its goal, completing a line between Allegan and Dundee before financial embarrassment landed it in receivership.

Corporate history 
The company incorporated on June 25, 1883, to consolidate the Toledo & Michigan, an Ohio company, and the Toledo & Milwaukee. The company filed articles on October 9, 1883 and began operations November 29. Beset by financial difficulties, the company went into receivership almost immediately; the Cincinnati, Jackson & Mackinaw (CJ&MK) bought the company on March 25, 1887.

Discussing the liabilities assumed by the CJ&MK in acquiring the M&O and other companies, Michigan's railroad commissioner wrote that:
"...a sum so largely in excess of the real value of the property as to suggest unfavorable comment upon the policy of loading down a new enterprise with liabilities that cannot fail to seriously impair the financial standing of the corporation."

Michigan operations 
From the Toledo & Milwaukee the M&O inherited  of track in revenue service between Allegan and Montieth, where the tracks crossed those of the Grand Rapids & Indiana, and a completed-but-not-operational stretch  in length east from Montieth through Battle Creek and Marshall to Dundee, in Monroe County. The M&O promptly opened this new section opened on November 29, 1883. The Toledo & Milwaukee had also leased the tracks of the Toledo, Ann Arbor & Grand Trunk, which ran south from Dundee to Toledo, Ohio, the company no longer having the funds to complete its own line.

The M&O continued this leasing arrangement; in 1884, when the TAA&GT merged into the Toledo, Ann Arbor & North Michigan, the M&O continued to lease the Dundee–Toledo line from the new company, although the last two miles from Manhattan Junction to Toledo proper were leased from a new concern, the Wheeling and Lake Erie Railroad.

References 

Railway companies established in 1883
Railway companies disestablished in 1887
Defunct Michigan railroads
Predecessors of the New York Central Railroad
Defunct Ohio railroads